Joseph J. Romm (born June 27, 1960) is an American author, editor, physicist and climate expert, who advocates reducing greenhouse gas emissions to limit global warming and increasing energy security through energy efficiency, green energy technologies and green transportation technologies. Romm is a Fellow of the American Association for the Advancement of Science. In 2009, Rolling Stone magazine named Romm to its list of "100 People Who Are Changing America", and Time magazine named him one of its "Heroes of the Environment (2009)", calling him "The Web's most influential climate-change blogger".

Romm is the founding Editor-in-Chief of progressive news aggregator Front Page Live. He has written for various energy and news sources, and he was the Chief Science Advisor for documentary series Years of Living Dangerously, which won the 2014 Emmy Award for Outstanding Documentary or Nonfiction Series. At the Center for American Progress, where he was a Senior Fellow, he founded the climate blog, Climate Progress in 2006, which became part of the Think Progress website. Time magazine named Romm's blog one of the "Top 15 Green Websites". In 2009, Thomas L. Friedman, in The New York Times, called Climate Progress "the indispensable blog", and in 2010, Time included it in a list of the 25 "Best Blogs of 2010".

In the 1990s, Romm served at the U.S. Department of Energy including, for six months, as Acting Assistant Secretary. He has published several books on global warming and energy technology. His 2006 book Hell and High Water summarized observations and forecasts of climate change, discussed technology and policy solutions, and criticized political disinformation used to undermine climate science. His 2015 book, Climate Change: What Everyone Needs to Know, covers basic climate science in a Q&A format. He has also written books on how scientists and activists can communicate more persuasively to explain science and policy to the public. His 2012 book, Language Intelligence, concerns the effective use of rhetoric, and his 2018 book, How to Go Viral and Reach Millions discusses how to tell scientific stories in ways that draw attention and connect with people emotionally.

Biography

Early life and career
Romm was born and grew up in Middletown, New York, the youngest of three sons of Al Romm (1926–1999), managing editor of the Times Herald-Record newspaper, and Ethel Grodzins Romm, a retired author, journalist, project manager, former CEO of an environmental technology company and former chair of the Lyceum Society of the New York Academy of Sciences. Romm's brother David was the host and producer of Shockwave Radio Theater on KFAI-FM, and his brother Daniel is a retired physician. His uncle is physicist Lee Grodzins, and his aunt was library science expert Anne Grodzins Lipow. Romm graduated from Middletown High School in 1978.

Romm then attended the Massachusetts Institute of Technology, where he earned a Bachelor of Science degree in 1982 and a Ph.D. in 1987, both in physics. He pursued part of his graduate work at the Scripps Institution of Oceanography. In 1987, Romm was awarded an American Physical Society Congressional Science Fellowship for the U.S. House of Representatives, where he provided science and security policy advice on the staff of Representative Charles E. Bennett.

From 1988 to 1990, Romm worked as Special Assistant for International Security at the Rockefeller Foundation.  From 1991 to 1993, he was a researcher at the Rocky Mountain Institute. He co-authored the 1994 Rocky Mountain Institute Report, Greening the Building and the Bottom Line: Increasing Productivity Through Energy-Efficient Design. For the Global Environment and Technology Foundation, he performed the first environmental analysis of a system integrating cogenerating fuel cells, fly wheels, and power electronics aimed at achieving very high-availability power. In 1990 and 1991, Romm taught a course entitled "Rethinking National Security" at Columbia University's School of International and Public Affairs.

In 1992, Romm published The Once and Future Superpower, a book describing his views on how to spend the peace dividend to restore America's economic, energy and environmental security. In 1993, he wrote Defining National Security: The Nonmilitary Aspects, for the Council on Foreign Relations, describing how America's security depends on non-military factors such as how it obtains energy.  In 1994, Romm published Lean and Clean Management, a book that discussed management techniques that can reduce the impact of manufacturing and other industries on the environment while increasing productivity and profits.  He co-authored, with Charles B. Curtis, "MidEast Oil Forever," the cover story of the April 1996 issue of the Atlantic Monthly, which discussed alternative energy strategies. The same year, he co-authored a paper for the ACEEE Summer Study on Energy Efficiency in Buildings on "Policies to Reduce Heat Islands". In 1999, Romm published Cool Companies: How the Best Businesses Boost Profits and Productivity by Cutting Greenhouse Gas Emissions, the first book to benchmark corporate best practices for using advanced energy technologies to reduce greenhouse gas emissions.

Service at the U.S. Department of Energy

Romm served as Acting Assistant Secretary of the U.S. Department of Energy, in charge of the Office of Energy Efficiency and Renewable Energy for six months in 1997 and as Principal Deputy Assistant Secretary from August 1995 through June 1998, and Special Assistant for Policy and Planning from 1993 to July 1995. This office, with an annual budget at the time of $1 billion and 550 employees, assists businesses in the industrial, utility, transportation and buildings sectors to develop and use advanced clean energy technologies to cut costs, increase reliability, and reduce pollution.

As Principal Deputy Assistant Secretary, Romm was in charge of all policy and technology analysis and programmatic development for the Office, which was then developing PEM fuel cells, microturbines, advanced cogeneration, superconductivity, building controls, photovoltaics and other renewables, biofuels, and hydrogen production and storage.  Among other projects, he initiated, supervised, and publicized a comprehensive technical analysis in 1997 by five national laboratories of how energy technologies can best reduce greenhouse gas emissions cost-effectively, entitled Scenarios of U.S. Carbon Reductions.

1998 to 2006
After leaving the Department of Energy, Romm was the executive director and founder of the non-profit Center for Energy and Climate Solutions, an organization based in the Washington DC area that helped businesses and U.S. States adopt high-leverage strategies for saving energy and cutting pollution and greenhouse gas emissions.  He was also a principal of the Capital E Group, which consulted on technology assessment and sustainable design services for clean energy technologies, and sat on the Advisory Board of Securing America's Future Energy. While at Capital E Group, Romm was also a registered lobbyist, representing the interests of clients Ion America and Sunpower Corp.

During these years, Romm wrote widely on global warming and energy technologies that can reduce global warming.  His 2004 book, The Hype about Hydrogen, argues that putting off the implementation of current green technologies in favor of waiting for technological breakthroughs in hydrogen cars is a dangerous distraction that will delay urgently needed government action on reducing greenhouse gas emissions. The book was named one of the best science and technology books of 2004 by Library Journal. In reviewing the book, Daniel I. Sperling, then a member of California Air Resources Board, offered dissenting views. In 2004, Romm also wrote the National Commission on Energy Policy's report, "The Car and Fuel of the Future", which was rated the #1 Hottest Article on Energy Policy by ScienceDirect. He was also the principal investigator for the National Science Foundation project, Future Directions for Hydrogen Energy Research and Education (2004).   Romm is interviewed in the 2006 documentary film Who Killed the Electric Car?, directed by Chris Paine and narrated by Martin Sheen.  In the film, Romm gives a presentation intended to show that the government's "hydrogen car initiative" was a bad policy choice and a distraction that was delaying the exploitation of more promising technologies, such as electric and hybrid cars that could reduce greenhouse gas emissions and increase America's energy security.  As of 2010, Romm continued to view hydrogen as a "breakthrough technology illusion".

Romm's 2006 book Hell and High Water projects that humans have a window of opportunity of only about a decade to head off the most catastrophic effects of global warming.  It calls upon Americans to demand government action to encourage and require the use of current emission-cutting technologies.  Tyler Hamilton, in his review of the book for The Toronto Star, wrote: "Whereas the first third of Romm's book presents overwhelming and disturbing evidence that human-caused greenhouse gases are the primary ingredients behind global warming, the pages that follow offer alarming detail on how the U.S. public is being misled by a federal government (backed by conservative political forces) that is intent on inaction, and that's also on a mission to derail international efforts to curb emissions." Technology Review wrote that Hell and High Water "provides an accurate summary of what is known about global warming and climate change, a sensible agenda for technology and policy, and a primer on how political disinformation has undermined climate science."

Climate Progress and recent years
Beginning in  2006, Romm was a Senior Fellow at the Center for American Progress, where he founded their climate blog, Climate Progress, which focused on climate science, policy and reporting. In 2008, Time magazine named his blog one of the "Top 15 Green Websites", writing that it "counters bad science and inane rhetoric with original analysis delivered sharply. ...  Romm occupies the intersection of climate science, economics and policy. Resist temptation to lump him in with knee-jerk enviros. On his blog and in his December 2006 book, Hell and High Water, you can find some of the most cogent, memorable, and deployable arguments for immediate and overwhelming action to confront global warming." In 2010, Time magazine wrote, "Viewing climate change through the prism of national security, Romm analyzes breaking energy news and the relevant research, but most important, he challenges the beliefs and conclusions of the mainstream media on climate-change issues." Romm contributed to the site until 2019. At the same time, he has continued to write for other energy and news sites, including The Huffington Post, Grist, Slate, CNN, and Salon.com. His 2012 New York Times opinion piece was called "Without Carbon Controls, We Face a Dust Bowl". After Queen Elizabeth II died in 2022, Romm urged Charles III to continue his climate advocacy as a non-political, moral imperative.

Romm has testified at various times before congressional committees on energy and global warming issues, offering his views on government action to curb global warming. For example, in July 2012, he testified before a Natural Resources Subcommittee of the U.S. House of Representatives on the 2012 U.S. drought and wildfires.  In March of the same year, he testified before the House Energy & Commerce Committee on "The American Energy Initiative" and rising gasoline prices. In 2010, he testified before the House Ways and Means Committee on how to optimize "Energy Tax Incentives Driving the Green Job Economy", and in 2007, he testified before the House Committee on Science and Technology on the subject of "Fuels for the Future", specifically the use of liquid fuel from coal, which he believes would accelerate global warming. He also lectures on energy technology, global warming and how the media portrays climate change.

Romm's 2010 book, Straight Up, is "largely a selection of his best blog postings over the past few years related to climate change issues". TreeHugger describes the book as "a whirlwind tour through the state of climate change, the media that so badly neglects it, the politicians who attempt to address it (and those who obstruct their efforts and ignore [the] science), and the clean energy solutions that could help get us out of the mess." In 2011, Romm sat on the panel of the Green Car Summit of the Washington Auto Show. His 2012 book, Language Intelligence, concerns persuasion and the effective use of rhetoric. Ed Markey commented on the book, "Joe masterfully ... scripts ways to master the metaphor, and incorporate irony. Solutions the reader can use for speeches, social media, or just winning the debate around the kitchen table." Romm wrote an article for Time magazine in August 2012 using the research from Language Intelligence to analyze whether Mitt Romney or Barack Obama is the more effective communicator. In speeches and lectures since then, Romm has encouraged scientists to use the principles of effective communication outlined in the book (instead of their accustomed, technical, neutral style) to better explain the dangers of, and solutions to, climate change to lay people and the media.

Romm was the chief science editor for the documentary TV series Years of Living Dangerously, about the impact of and solutions to climate change. The first season of the series ran in 2014 on the Showtime network and won the 2014 Emmy Award for Outstanding Documentary or Nonfiction Series. Romm also wrote "Climate Change 101: An Introduction", for the series' website. A second season ran in 2016 on the National Geographic Channel. In 2015, The Weather Channel included Romm as one of "the world's 25 most compelling voices" on climate in its series The Climate 25. That year, Romm also wrote the book Climate Change: What Everyone Needs to Know, a primer on the topic, in Q&A format. Ralph Benko in Forbes magazine wrote that the "impressive book ... lucidly presents the case both for deep concern and optimism". In New York magazine, David Wallace-Wells cited the book as an "authoritative primer". Romm's 2018 book, How to Go Viral and Reach Millions, "teaches everything from word choice to how to recast your scientific stories in ways that connect with people emotionally. … Romm teaches [how] to become a force of good in this world using time-tested techniques".

In June 2019, Romm founded a progressive news aggregator, Front Page Live, together with Carl Cameron, Laura Dawn, Sunny Hundal, Helen Stickler and others. Romm was its first Editor-in-Chief.

Media comment and interviews
Romm is often cited, quoted or interviewed by journalists to explain the impact of public policy and energy technologies and applications on global warming and energy security, or to explain causes and impacts of climate change or the influence of the media. For example, In 2009, MSNBC relied on him to assess natural gas hydrates, and he was featured on 60 Minutes discussing the scientific evidence that "clean coal" is not clean. In 2010, MSNBC's Countdown with Keith Olbermann program interviewed Romm on how the military is taking action on climate change to improve national security; Guernica Magazine interviewed him on the science and politics of global warming; The New Yorker asked him to comment on the Koch-funded exhibit on evolution and climate change at the National Museum of Natural History; and The Atlantic and CBS News each reviewed a media call by Romm concerning the relationship between the January 2010 snowstorms in Washington, DC and global warming.

In 2011, The Washington Post linked with approval to Romm's review of the scientific literature on climate change. Time magazine explored Romm's critique of Matthew Nisbet and praised his analysis of the decline of media coverage regarding climate change. National Geographic quoted him about the part that the media has played in the dearth of information about climate reaching the public. The same year, Technology Review quoted Romm regarding the relationship between government-assisted deployment and rapid innovation in energy technologies, and the Toronto Star quoted him regarding President Obama's 2011 State of the Union address. In 2012 in The New York Times, economist Paul Krugman cited Romm on the connection between drought and Climate change, and The Atlantic interviewed and cited him on the reluctance of the Democrats to discuss climate change. National Geographic quoted him about disappearing arctic ice and the effect of climate change on the polar bear, and Current TV's Bill Press interviewed Romm about record-breaking heat.

In 2014 Businessweek quoted Romm regarding the lack of commercial viability of hydrogen fuel cells for cars, and The Guardian quoted him concerning international cooperation on climate change. In 2015, The Guardian quoted Romm about historic high global temperatures, and MarketWatch quoted him on actions that Donald Trump might take concerning climate agreements if he were to be elected president. Later that year, Bulletin of the Atomic Scientists interviewed Romm about nuclear power and climate change. The Wall Street Journal quoted him in 2016 about the cost and pace of change in clean energy technology. In 2017, Mother Jones listed Romm's reading recommendations for "understanding in this age of rancor". The same year, Huffington Post said that Romm's 2017 appearance on Sam Harris's podcast "over the course of two hours unpacks the scientific case for climate change like only Romm can."

In 2018, Tucker Carlson interviewed Romm on Fox News about the threat of global warming. Later that year, Romm was quoted by Alaska Public Media regarding Lisa Murkowski's record on climate change and in The Guardian about President Trump and the Clean Power Plan. Friedman cited Romm in The New York Times in 2019 regarding the proposed Green New Deal. GQ Britain quoted Romm in 2020 criticizing carbon offsets. In 2022, writing for CNN, Romm argued that Charles III, who has been a climate activist for decades, "should make climate change a key focus of his reign" despite his obligations as king.

Romm's views

The New York Times "Dot Earth" column reviewed Romm's views on global warming solutions on November 24, 2008, including his belief that, to combat global warming, humans cannot wait for new technologies and scientific breakthroughs; that instead we must "deploy existing and near-term low-carbon technologies as fast as is humanly possible".  In his blog, Romm has described the technology solutions that he believes can control global warming. The New York Times also quoted Romm as stating that, to solve the climate crisis, "We will need a WWII-style approach".  The article noted Romm's belief that "credible people" and the press should publicly support the notion that government action is needed to help solve the global warming crisis.  In particular, the press should explain how current news stories, such as hurricanes, droughts and insect infestations are related to global warming.

According to U.S. News & World Report, Romm believes that global warming "is advancing more swiftly than most people think and than the mainstream media usually report.  He has called for significantly ramping up government spending on clean energy technology, halting the construction of new coal plants, rapidly increasing the use of energy-efficient technologies, and imposing a cap and trade system to sharply limit carbon dioxide emissions".  In 2006, in a radio interview, Romm stated, "Global warming is going to transform this country and our transportation and the way we live our lives.  If we don't act pretty soon, in an intelligent fashion, then change will be forced upon us by the radically changed climate...  global warming is the issue of the century". In March 2009, Romm summarized and updated his views in an "introduction" to his blog, and in another post, setting forth a summary of "global warming impacts".

In 2011, Romm stated that "Feeding some 9 billion people by mid-century in the face of a rapidly worsening climate may well be the greatest challenge the human race has ever faced."  Romm's 2010 book, Straight Up notes: "the bottom line is that the economic cost of action is low, whereas the cost of inaction is incalculably greater".  Romm calculates that deployment of existing technologies on the massive scale that can save the climate can be accomplished at the cost of 0.12 percent of global GDP per year. He also asks in the book, "will the United States be a global leader in creating jobs and exports in clean energy technologies, or will we be importing them from Europe, Japan, and the likely clean energy leader in our absence, China." In 2005, with respect to the U.S. Congress's actions on climate, including its votes on the XL Pipeline, Romm told The Guardian: "Future generations suffering from the consequences of our inaction will be bewildered that the legislative body of the richest country in the world could devote so little effort to ameliorating the climate problem and so much effort to making it worse."

Romm has been critical of media coverage of global warming.  In his 2010 book, Straight Up, he wrote, "Historically, even the most respected newspapers have fallen into the trap of giving the same credence – and often the same amount of space – to a handful of U.S. scientists, most receiving funds from the fossil fuel industry, as they give to hundreds of the world's leading climate scientists.  No surprise that much of the public has ended up with a misimpression about the remarkable strength of our scientific understanding and the need for action".  He concludes, "more and more pieces are being written by senior political reporters, who know very little about global warming". Romm also believes that scientists and politicians need to be more effective communicators about climate change.

Reputation
In 2008, Romm was elected a Fellow of the American Association for the Advancement of Science for "distinguished service toward a sustainable energy future and for persuasive discourse on why citizens, corporations, and governments should adopt sustainable technologies".  In 2009, Rolling Stone magazine named Romm to its list of "100 People Who Are Changing America", quoting journalist David Roberts as follows: "Joe combines two qualities you don't often find together.  A deep knowledge of technology, policy and science along with genuine moral passion."  Former Houston, Texas mayor Bill White called Romm "the nation’s leading expert on energy efficiency."  U.S. News & World Report featured Romm as one of eight "key players" who were "Driving Public Policy in Washington", calling Romm an "oft-cited expert on climate change issues, and a go-to witness at congressional hearings".  Time magazine named Romm one of its "Heroes of the Environment (2009)", writing, "He combines ... intellect with a strong sense of moral outrage.  He also possesses a Jon Stewart-like quality for pointing out the absurdity of his opponents." Time named his blog as one of the "Top 15 Green Websites" in 2009. The same year, Thomas L. Friedman, in The New York Times, called Climate Progress "the indispensable blog".

In 2010, Time included Romm's blog in a list of the 25 "Best Blogs of 2010" and one of the "Top Five Blogs TIME Writers Read Daily".  The same year, TreeHugger named Romm's blog the "Best Politics Website", adding, "this is the art of blogging at its best".  The UK's The Guardian ranked Climate Progress at the top of its list of blogs in its "Top 50 Twitter climate accounts to follow".  Reviewing Romm's 2010 book Straight Up, Bill McKibben wrote that Romm "knows his climate science ... [and] has been a persuasive voice for the most important truth about global warming: that it is a far worse problem than either politicians or the general public understand. ... Romm has been consistent in insisting that we have much of the technology necessary to at least begin tackling the problem."  He called Romm "a tireless foil to the 'right-wing disinformation machine' that has tried – with great success ... to delay action by confusing and disheartening Americans about global warming. ...  It requires a thick skin to take on the daily task of dealing with the disinformers, but Romm has the taste for this kind of blood sport, and the talent as well." In 2011, The New York Times called Romm "one of the country’s most influential writers on climate change".  In 2012, Planetsave wrote that Romm is "considered the world’s best blogger on climate science, and politics related to it."

Personal life
Romm lives in Washington, D.C.  He has long had an interest in comedy. From 1994 through 2007, he was a regular contributor to The Style Invitational, a weekly humor contest run by The Washington Post. Among his submissions was the winning entry of what was later declared to be the best overall week's results of the Style Invitational's first decade. (A discarded first draft of some famous line: "We hold these truths to be, like, du-uuh.")

Bibliography
In addition to his books and other publications listed below, Romm has written or co-written numerous articles and lectured widely on global warming effects and solutions, clean technologies, business and environment issues and distributed energy. His articles have been published in Nature, U.S. News & World Report, Technology Review, Issues in Science and Technology, Forbes, Foreign Affairs, The New York Times, the Los Angeles Times, The Guardian, The Washington Post, Science, Scientific American, Physics Today, Physics World, The Economist, Time magazine, Grist magazine, Businessweek and Mother Earth News, among other publications.

In 2006, Romm and Prof. Andrew A. Frank co-authored "Hybrid Vehicles Gain Traction", published in Scientific American, in which they argue in favor of Plug-in hybrid electric vehicles. The same year, Romm published "California's Hydrogen Highway Reconsidered" in Golden Gate University Law Review. In 2007, he co-authored "Plugging into the Grid: How Plug-In Hybrid-Electric Vehicles Can Help Break America's Oil Addiction and Slow Global Warming" in the Progressive Policy Institute's Policy Report. Romm contributed a chapter to the 2007 book Energy and American Society: Thirteen Myths, disputing that "The Hydrogen Economy Is a Panacea". In 2008, Nature published Romm's article "Cleaning up on Carbon", in which he advocated "accelerating the deployment of the 11 wedges ... originally modelled by Socolow and Pacala." In 2011, Nature published Romm's article Desertification: The next dust bowl, exploring the dangers to the world economy and populations of droughts that are projected to be caused by climate change, such as food insecurity.

Books by Romm

  An updated edition was published in 2005.  The book has also been translated into German as Der Wasserstoff-boom.

 (Chapter 7, available online)

Selected journal articles and reports
Report: "The Self-Limiting Future of Nuclear Power" AmericanProgressAction.org, 2008
"The Car and Fuel of the Future", Energy Policy, 34 (2006), pp. 2609–14
"Future Directions for Hydrogen Energy Research and Education" (Principal Investigator), Report to the National Science Foundation, November 2004
"The internet and the new energy economy", Resources, Conservation and Recycling, p. 36 (2002) pp. 197–210
"Combined Heat and Power for Saving Energy and Carbon in Buildings" (with Kaarsberg, Koomey, Rosenfeld and Teagen), Proceedings of 1998 ACEEE Summer Study, Pacific Grove, CA, 1999
Report: "The Internet Economy and Global Warming" (with Arthur H. Rosenfeld and Susan Herrmann), Center for Energy and Climate Solutions, The Global Environment and Technology Foundation, 1999–2000
"Engineering-Economic Studies of Energy Technologies to Reduce Greenhouse Gas Emissions:  Opportunities and Challenges" (with Brown, Levine, Rosenfeld and Koomey), Annual Review of Energy and the Environment, 1998
"A Roadmap for U.S. Carbon Reductions" (with Levine, Brown, and Petersen), Science, January 30, 1998, vol. 279, no. 5351, pp. 669–70
"Cool Communities: Strategies for Heat Island Mitigation and Smog Reduction" (with Rosenfeld, Hashem Akbari and Melvin Pomerantz), Energy and Buildings 28 (1998) pp. 51–62
"Policies to Reduce Heat Islands" "Policies to Reduce Heat Islands" (with Rosenfeld, Akbari, Pomerantz and Haider G. Taha), 1996 ACEEE Summer Study on Energy Efficiency in Buildings, Pacific Grove, CA. Vol. 9, p. 177
"Greening the Building and the Bottom Line: Increasing Productivity Through Energy-Efficient Design" (with Browning), Rocky Mountain Institute, November 1994 (peer-reviewed by U.S. Green Building Council); first published as Proceedings of 1994 ACEEE Summer Study, Pacific Grove, CA

Notes

External links
Interview of Romm by Keith Olbermann regarding the News Corp. hacking scandal (2011)
Interview at The Commonwealth Club (2010)
Romm featured on Climate Denial Crock of the Week (2013)
Interview about the 5th IPCC report, by Thom Hartmann (2012)
Interview about the Clean Power Plan (2015)
Keynote speech at the annual sustainability event of the Colorado Renewable Energy Society, at University of Colorado Denver (2016)

American bloggers
American editors
American environmentalists
American non-fiction environmental writers
American political writers
American science writers
American male journalists
American male non-fiction writers
Center for American Progress people
Climate activists
Fellows of the American Association for the Advancement of Science
Green thinkers
Jewish American journalists
Jewish American scientists
Jewish American writers
Journalists from New York (state)
Living people
MIT Department of Physics alumni
People from Middletown, Orange County, New York
Sustainability advocates
Writers from Washington, D.C.
Writers from New York (state)
1960 births
Environmental bloggers
Activists from New York (state)
21st-century American non-fiction writers
American male bloggers
21st-century American Jews